Puerto Boyacá is a Colombian river-port town and municipality by the Magdalena River in the Boyacá Department, where is also considered a Special Handling Zone due to its port status. Its main industries are oil exploration and processing. In the 1980s and early 1990s, Puerto Boyacá was affected intensively by the Colombian Armed Conflict.

Borders 
 North - departments of Bolívar, Santander
 West - Magdalena River and Puerto Berrío, Puerto Nare, Puerto Triunfo and Sonsón municipalities of Antioquia Department
 South - Puerto Salgar and Yacopí municipalities of Cundinamarca
 East - municipality of Otanche (Boyacá)

Born in Puerto Boyacá 
 Fredy Guarín, Colombian football player

Gallery

Other information 
 Market Day: Sunday 
 Distance from Tunja: 373 km 
 Median temperature: 32 °C

Climate

References

External links 
 Puerto Boyacá municipality official website

Municipalities of Boyacá Department
Populated places on the Magdalena River
Port cities in Colombia